The Miss Louisiana's Outstanding Teen competition is the pageant that selects the representative for the U.S. state of Louisiana in the Miss America's Outstanding Teen pageant. The pageant is held each April at the Brown Auditorium at the University of Louisiana at Monroe in Monroe, Louisiana.

Mary Laura Hunt of Ruston was crowned Miss Louisiana's Outstanding Teen on April 10th, 2022 at the ULM Brown Auditorium in Monroe, Louisiana. She competed for the title of Miss America's Outstanding Teen 2023.

Results summary
The following is a visual summary of the past results of Miss Louisiana's Outstanding Teen titleholders presented in the table below. The year in parentheses indicates year of the Miss America's Outstanding Teen competition in which the placement and/or award was garnered.

Placements

 3rd runners-up: Mary Jane Hobgood (2008)
 4th runners-up: Sarah Katherine McCallum (2017)
 Top 10: Kelly Bernard (2010)
 Top 15: Justine Ker (2012), Chanley Patterson (2020)

Awards

Preliminary awards
 Preliminary Talent: Mary Jane Hobgood (2008)

Other awards
 Miss Congeniality/Spirit of America: Jeremeka Bradley (2007)
 Children's Miracle Network (CMN) Miracle Maker Award: Julia Claire Williams (2016)
 Overall Instrumental Talent Award: Justine Ker (2012), Chanley Patterson (2020)
 Overall Interview Award: Jeremeka Bradley (2007)
 Scholastic Excellence Award: Justine Ker (2012)
 Top 5 Interview Award: Sarah Katherine McCallum (2017)

Winners

References

External links
 Official website

Louisiana
Louisiana culture
Women in Louisiana
Annual events in Louisiana